The 1969 Northern Iowa Panthers football team was an American football team that represented the University of Northern Iowa in the North Central Conference (NCC) during the 1969 NCAA College Division football season. In its 10th season under head coach Stan Sheriff, the team compiled a 5–5 record, 4–2 against conference opponents, and finished in second place out of seven teams in the NCC.

Schedule

References

Northern Iowa
Northern Iowa Panthers football seasons
Northern Iowa Panthers football